Bonga Wanga is the fourth studio album of Japanese singer Toshinobu Kubota, released on July 15, 1990. Under the label, Kubota released his first single, "Be Wanabee" in October 1990, followed by "Mama Udongo" in March 1991. The lead single "Be Wanabee" charted at number 16 on the Oricon Weekly Singles chart. "Bonga Wanga" became Kubota's first album to peak number one on the Oricon Albums chart. The album also became certified million. That album contains several English lyrics.

In 1991, Kubota went on the Bonga Wanga Tour. In July 1991, Kubota release his concert videotape/DVD "Bonga Wonga Spring Tour 1991".

Track listing

Personnel
Backing Vocals – 501, Fonzi Thornton, Lynn Davis, Michelle Cobbs, Tawatha Agee, Toshinobu Kubota, Yoichiro Kakizaki
Bass – Bootsy Collins, Tom Barney, Tracy Wormworth
Drums – Anton Fig, William House
Engineer – Bruce Miller, Bruce Buchanan, Bruce Calder, Gerard Julien, James Kuoriak, Lolly Grodner, Mike Fossenkemper, Rich July, Susan Morrison
Engineer [Mastering] – Ted Jensen
Engineer [Technical] – Bruce Manning, Leticia Mulzac, Robin Thomas
Executive Producer – Hitoshi Ishitani, Yasohachi Itoh
Guitar – Bootsy Collins, Charlie Singleton, Chris Udell, Randy Bowland, William Patterson
Keyboards, Programmed By – Yoichiro Kakizaki
Lyrics By – Brother Tom, Toshinobu Kubota
Mixed By – Bruce Miller, Larry Fergusson
Music By – Toshinobu Kubota, Yoichiro Kakizaki
Orchestrated By – Toshinobu Kubota, Yoichiro Kakizaki
Percussion – Bashiri Johnson, Don Alias
Producer – Toshinobu Kubota
Programmed By [Synclavier] – John Mahoney, Laura Janisse

Charts

Oricon Sales Chart

References

1990 albums
Toshinobu Kubota albums
Sony Music albums